The 2009 All-Ireland Senior Club Camogie Championship for the leading clubs in the women's team field sport of camogie was won by Cashel from Tipperary, who defeated Athenry from Galway in the final, played at Clarecastle.

Arrangements
The championship was organised on the traditional provincial system used in Gaelic Games since the 1880s, with Oulart the Ballagh (Wexford) and Loughgiel Shamrocks (Antrim) winning the championships of the other two provinces.

The Final
The final was played in high winds and torrential rain, Cashel holding on to win by two points despite the arrival of Jessica Gill on the Athenry team after being sidelined since September with cruciate ligament damage.

Final stages

References

External links
 Camogie Association

2009 in camogie
2009